In organic chemistry, keto acids or ketoacids (also called oxo acids or oxoacids) are organic compounds that contain a carboxylic acid group and a ketone group.  In several cases, the keto group is hydrated.  The alpha-keto acids are especially important in biology as they are involved in the Krebs citric acid cycle and in glycolysis.

Common types of keto acids include:
Alpha-keto acids, alpha-ketoacids, or 2-oxoacids have the keto group adjacent to the carboxylic acid. They often arise by oxidative deamination of amino acids, and reciprocally, they are precursors to the same.  Alpha-keto acids possesses extensive chemistry as acylation agents. Furthermore, alpha-keto acids such as phenylpyruvic acid are endogenous sources for carbon monoxide (as a gasotransmitter) and pharmaceutical prodrug scaffold. Important representatives:
pyruvic acid, pervasive intermediate in metabolism.
oxaloacetic acid, a component of the Krebs cycle. 
alpha-ketoglutarate, a 5-carbon ketoacid derived from glutamic acid. Alpha-ketoglutarate participates in cell signaling by functioning as a coenzyme. It is commonly used in transamination reactions.
Beta-keto acids, beta-ketoacids, or 3-oxoacids, such as acetoacetic acid, have the ketone group at the second carbon from the carboxylic acid. They generally form by the Claisen condensation. The presence of the keto group at the beta position allows them to easily undergo thermal decarboxylation.
Gamma-keto acids, Gamma-ketoacids, or 4-oxoacids have the ketone group at the third carbon from the carboxylic acid. Levulinic acid is an example.

Keto acids appear in a wide variety of anabolic pathways in metabolism. For instance, in plants (specifically, in hemlock, pitcher plants, and fool's parsley), 5-oxo-octanoic acid is converted in enzymatic and non-enzymatic steps into the cyclic class of coniine alkaloids.

When ingested sugars and carbohydrate levels are low, stored fats and proteins are the primary source of energy production. Glucogenic amino acids from proteins are converted to glucose. Ketogenic amino acids can be deaminated to produce alpha keto acids and ketone bodies.

Alpha keto acids are used primarily as energy for liver cells and in fatty acid synthesis, also in the liver.

See also
Ulosonic acids
Pseudoacid

References

External links